Feelin' Red is an album by pianist Red Garland which was recorded in 1978 and released on the Muse label in 1979.

Reception

The AllMusic review by stated "Garland was a professional boxer, and his pugilistic sensibilities are audible in the rough-and-tumble way he approaches the keyboard. ... Captured in flight with his late-'70s working trio of Sam Jones and Al Foster, Garland lays down a bevy of authoritative runs over a propulsive rhythm section. Solid but searching and undeniably soulful, Feelin' Red is Garland in top form".

Track listing
 "It's All Right With Me" (Cole Porter) – 8:40
 "You Better Go Now" (Robert Graham, Bickley Reichner) – 4:23
 "On a Clear Day" (Burton Lane, Alan Jay Lerner) – 8:30
 "Going Home" (Traditional) – 8:01
 "The Second Time Around" (Jimmy Van Heusen, Sammy Cahn) – 3:13
 "I Wish I Knew" (Harry Warren, Mack Gordon) – 3:55
 "Cherokee" (Ray Noble) – 5:32

Personnel
Red Garland – piano
Sam Jones – bass
Al Foster – drums

References

Muse Records albums
Red Garland albums
1979 albums